Ghanpur may refer to several places in the Indian state of Telangana:

 Ghanpur, Mulugu district
 Ghanpur, Janagon district
 Ghanpur, Ranga Reddy district
 Ghanpur, Wanaparthy district